Aktor (English: Actor) is the third studio album by Polish band 2 Plus 1, released in 1977 by Polskie Nagrania Muza. The LP was a tribute to Polish actor Zbigniew Cybulski, who died in 1967. The album commemorated the 10th anniversary of his death. It wasn't a commercial success due to its less-commercial sound, but was praised by critics. The album was re-released on CD in 2001.

Track listing 
Lyrics by Marek Dutkiewicz.  Music written and arranged by Janusz Kruk.
Side A:
 "Prolog" – 3:44
 "Rozmowa z cyganką w wigilię niedzieli" – 1:35
 "Setki mil" – 3:27
 "Stop-klatka" – 2:59
 "Song dziewczyny I" – 3:13
 "Dzień, w którym umarł film" – 3:39

Side B:
 "Song dziewczyny II" – 2:04
 "Ogromne zmęczenie" – 9:54
 "Ojciec nocy, ojciec dnia" – 3:10
 "Muzyka w serca wstąpi nam" – 3:21

Note: Some editions of this album feature tracks 2, 3 and 4 as an extended suite.

Personnel
Elzbieta Dmoch: Flute, Vocals
Janusz Kruk: Guitars, Piano, Vocals
Janusz Koman: Fender Rhodes
Cezary Szlazak: Sax, Vocals
Adam Pilawa: Violin
Andrzej Pawlik: Bass, Vocals
Andrzej Wojicik: Drums
Jozef Gawrych: Percussion

External links 
 Aktor on Discogs

References 

1977 albums
2 Plus 1 albums
Polish-language albums
Pop albums by Polish artists
Tribute albums to non-musicians
Cultural depictions of Polish men